Two on a Doorstep is a 1936 British comedy film directed by Lawrence Huntington and starring Kay Hammond, Harold French and Anthony Hankey. The film was made at Rock Studios, Elstree. It was made as a quota quickie for release by the American company Paramount Pictures.

Cast
 Kay Hammond as Jill Day 
 Harold French as Jimmy Blair 
 Anthony Hankey as Peter Day  
 George Mozart as George  
 Dorothy Dewhurst as Mrs. Beamish  
 Frank Tickle as Mr. Beamish  
 Walter Tobias as Diggle  
 Ted Sanders as Bit Part

References

Bibliography
Chibnall, Steve. Quota Quickies: The Birth of the British 'B' Film. British Film Institute, 2007.
Low, Rachael. Filmmaking in 1930s Britain. George Allen & Unwin, 1985.
Wood, Linda. British Films, 1927–1939. British Film Institute, 1986.

External links

1936 films
British comedy films
British black-and-white films
1936 comedy films
Films directed by Lawrence Huntington
Films shot at Rock Studios
Films produced by Anthony Havelock-Allan
British and Dominions Studios films
1930s English-language films
1930s British films